Ghulam Haidar (1939  10 June 2020), known by his pen name as Haidari Wujodi, was an Afghan poet and scholar who primarily wrote mystical and Sufi poetry in Persian language throughout his life. He wrote numerous books, of which fourteen to fifteen were published. He also used to write columns for domestic newspapers aimed at literature.

He was born in Panjshir Province of Afghanistan. He did his fifth and sixth grade education from a school in his hometown. He had one son, two daughters and four siblings.

Biography 
At fifteen, Haidari went to Kabul, the capital city of Afghanistan where he established his literary associations with Sufi Ashqari at his bookbinding shop. Ashqari later introduced him to a group of poets who used to exchange verses while gathering in his shop. Later, he subsequently joined a public library and started working for earning purposes. During the early 1990s, the Islamic government following the Afghan Soviet withdrawal, offered him a job at an educational foundation where he used to work at periodicals section every day for one hour.

Prior to start writing poetry, he served a six-year military career with the Afghan Army before starting administrative work for the government in 1964? and remained associated with military service for six years, and later was appointed head of the Kabul Library where he served until 2020. After he retired from the literary service at public library, he wrote a letter to former Afghan president Hamid Karzai, requesting to construct doors and walls at a literary workplace and wished to work there for free. The president, however, accepted the offer and also issued a decree granting him permanent pay and retention.

Death 
Haidari died of COVID-19 on 10 June 2020, in Kabul, Afghanistan.

Literary work

References

Notes

1939 births
2020 deaths
Deaths from the COVID-19 pandemic in Afghanistan
20th-century Afghan poets
Poets from Panjshir Province
Persian-language poets